Monosodium citrate, more correctly, sodium dihydrogen citrate (Latin: natrium citricum acidulatum), is an acid salt of citric acid. Disodium citrate and trisodium citrate are also known. It can be prepared by partial neutralisation of citric acid with an aqueous solution of sodium bicarbonate or carbonate. It has a slightly acidic taste.

NaHCO3 + C6H8O7 → NaC6H7O7  + CO2  + H2O

Na2CO3 + 2C6H8O7 → 2NaC6H7O7  + CO2  + H2O

It is highly soluble in water and practically insoluble in ethanol. Monosodium citrate is used as an anticoagulant in donated blood. It is used as an alkalinizing agent to prevent kidney stone disease. The crystals form as nearly perfect cubes.

References

Organic sodium salts
Food additives
Citrates
Acid salts
E-number additives